The Nonconnah Creek (or the Nonconnah Creek Drainage Canal) is a  waterway in southwest Tennessee. It starts in extreme southeastern Shelby County, Tennessee, near the town of Collierville. From there, it flows westward, forming the southern border of Germantown. The creek continues to flow west through Memphis and through Whitehaven. Nonconnah Creek empties into McKellar Lake, an oxbow of the Mississippi River. There are three major expressways that follow most of its route. These are Interstate 55, Interstate 240, and Tennessee State Route 385, formerly named and still locally referred to as "Nonconnah Parkway".

History 
Nonconnah Creek was created from glacial runoff around 12,000 years ago. Prior to around year 400, the creek flowed from its headwaters west-northwesterly until the location of the present-day I-240/TN 385 interchange. From there it continued across what is now East Memphis and Midtown and connected with the Wolf River just before it empties into the Mississippi River. Around AD 400, a massive seismic event in the Ellendale Fault (part of the New Madrid Fault system) raised a low ridge across present-day east Memphis, diverting Nonconnah Creek away from the Wolf, causing it to flow directly into the Mississippi River several miles south of the Wolf's mouth. The lowermost section of the Nonconnah that continued to flow into the Wolf eventually became known as Cypress Creek.

Nonconnah Creek was widened and channelized in the 20th century (like many of the rivers in West Tennessee) from its mouth to near Houston Levee Road in Collierville.

Name
Nonconnah is a name derived from the Choctaw language or Chickasaw language purported to mean "seer, prophet".

Drainage basin 
The Nonconnah Creek watershed covers parts of two counties in Tennessee (Shelby and Fayette) and two counties in Mississippi (Marshall and Desoto). The creek drains approximately half of the city of Memphis, the rest being drained by the Wolf River.

Major flooding 
Major floods occurred in the basin on November 21, 1934,when 10.48 inches of rain fell in 24 hours, and on May 9, 1958, when 4.76 inches of rain fell in approximately eight hours. The most recent significant flood occurred on December 3, 1978, when 4.9 inches were recorded at the Memphis International Airport. The 1978 storm appears to be between the 5-year and 10-year frequency events. Under present day conditions, the 1934 and 1958 flood levels would cause considerably higher damages due to increased urbanization.

Backwater flooding 
If the Mississippi River gets above 40 feet on the Memphis river gauge, the Nonconnah, along with other local streams and rivers connected to the Mississippi, will begin to experience backwater flooding, which is when these streams begin to flow backwards as the Mississippi river rises and fills them. Backwater flooding occurred in both the 1927 and 1937 floods along the Mississippi River. In the 1940s, the U.S. Army Corps of Engineers built an earthen levee system with pumping stations along the northern side of Nonconnah Creek from its mouth to Prospect Street in South Memphis. During the 2011 Mississippi River floods, these levees kept water off of the northern side. However, backwater flooding occurred on the south side causing damage to several subdivisions. The creek also flowed backwards within its channel to the Lamar Avenue (U.S. Route 78) overpass.

Greenbelt 
The Nonconnah Greenbelt, a proposed system of trails, is currently being planned and constructed. If completed, it would stretch from Collierville to the Mississippi River. Phase I was completed in late 2007. It is located near Collierville near the intersection of TN 385 and Forest Hill Irene Road.

See also 
 Mississippi River Flood Map of 1927
 2011 Mississippi River floods
List of rivers of Tennessee

External links 
 National Weather Service, Hydrologic Prediction Service, Mississippi River
 U.S. Army Corps of Engineers Mississippi River At Memphis, TN (Weather Bureau Gage)Gage Zero: 183.91 Ft, Record High Stage:48.7 Ft. = 232.61' Memphis River Gage Record High in Feet Above Sea Level
 Federal Emergency Management Agency, FEMA issued Flood Maps
 Photo 35, Year 1927, Looking West from U.S. 61 bridge along the sandbagged levee and Photo 39 February 9, 1937. Looking west at Nonconnah Levee and Florida Street along the sandbagged levee. Photo 40 Nonconnah backwater in the vicinity of Federal Compress & Warehouse Company in South Memphis February 9, 1937.
 U.S. Army Corps of Engineers, Memphis District,  PROJECT: Nonconnah Creek, Tennessee and Mississippi
 Aerial view of the Wolf River and Nonconnah Creek
 Nonconnah Flood Plain & Perkins Bridge Collapse

References 

Rivers of Tennessee
Rivers of Mississippi
Bodies of water of Shelby County, Tennessee
Bodies of water of Fayette County, Tennessee
Bodies of water of Marshall County, Mississippi
Bodies of water of DeSoto County, Mississippi
Mississippi placenames of Native American origin
Tennessee placenames of Native American origin